Eric Larsen is an American Polar adventurer known for his expeditions to the North Pole, South Pole, and Mount Everest.

Early life
Larsen was born 1971 in Cedarburg, Wisconsin.  He worked as a guide and educator at  Environmental Learning Centers Wolf Ridge and Eagle Bluff.

Expeditions
Last South - South Pole Solo speed record attempt - 2018
In December 2018, Larsen attempted to be the Solo unsupported, unassisted speed record from Hercules Inlet to the South Pole in Antarctica. Larsen encountered unusual weather and snow conditions and aborted his attempt after three weeks.

Jabou Ri First Ascent - 2015
On September 16, Larsen and Ryan Waters became the first to ascend the peak of Nepal's Jabou Ri, a Himalayan peak in an area only recently opened to climbers. 

Last North Expedition - 2014
In March 2014, Larsen and Ryan Waters crossed the Arctic Ocean from Northern Ellesmere Island to the geographic North Pole.  Larsen has stated that his expedition may be the last ever to the North Pole because of melting ice due to climate change. 
 
Cycle South Expedition - 2012
In December 2012, Eric Larsen attempted to be the first person to bike to the South Pole. Departing Hercules Inlet, he made it 175 miles before turning around. In his attempt he set the record for the most miles traveled by bicycle in Antarctica.

Save the Poles - 2009/2010
During a 365-day period Eric Larsen did expeditions to the North Pole, the South Pole, and Mount Everest. He is the first person to do all three "poles" in one year's time period.
 
One World Expedition- 2006
In the first successful 'summer' style North Pole expedition Larsen and teammate Lonnie Dupre departed Cape Discovery, Ellesmere Island and arrived at the North Pole on July 2, after 62 days on the ice.

Book

On Thin Ice 
In March 2014, Eric Larsen and Ryan Waters set out to traverse nearly 500 miles across the melting Arctic Ocean, unsupported, from Northern Ellesmere Island to the geographic North Pole. Despite being one of the most cold and hostile environments on the planet, the Arctic Ocean has seen a steady and significant reduction of sea ice over the past seven years due to climate change. Because of this, Larsen's and Waters' trip—dubbed the "Last North Expedition"—is expected to be the last human-powered trek to the North Pole, ever.

Documentary

Melting - Last Race to the Pole
The Arctic is warming twice as fast as the rest of the globe, so the window to cross the ice to the majestic North Pole is closing quickly. Eric Larsen, one of the most accomplished polar explorers, and Ryan Waters, a veteran extreme mountaineer, risk their lives to reach the North Pole before that opportunity is gone forever.

Cancer

In January 2021, Eric was initially diagnosed with Stage 4 colorectal cancer, but upon further biopsies was categorized as Stage 3b. After a year of intensive chemotherapy, radiation and surgery, he is currently NED (No Evidence of Disease).

References

External links

American polar explorers
Living people
American motivational speakers
Explorers of Antarctica
People from Cedarburg, Wisconsin
Year of birth missing (living people)